, short for Manshu Detachment 731 and also known as the Kamo Detachment and the Ishii Unit, was a covert biological and chemical warfare research and development unit of the Imperial Japanese Army that engaged in lethal human experimentation and biological weapons manufacturing during the Second Sino-Japanese War (1937–1945) and World War II.  The unit is estimated to have killed between 200,000 and 300,000 people. It was based in the Pingfang district of Harbin, the largest city in the Japanese puppet state of Manchukuo (now Northeast China) and had active branch offices throughout China and Southeast Asia.

Unit 731 was responsible for some of the most notorious war crimes committed by the Japanese armed forces. It routinely conducted tests on people who were dehumanized and internally referred to as "logs". Experiments included disease injections, controlled dehydration, hypobaric chamber experiments, biological weapons testing, vivisection, amputation, and standard weapons testing. Victims included not only kidnapped men, women (including pregnant women) and children, but also babies born from the systemic rape perpetrated by the staff inside the compound. The victims came from different nationalities, with the majority being Chinese and a significant minority being Russian. Additionally, Unit 731 produced biological weapons that were used in areas of China not occupied by Japanese forces, which included Chinese cities and towns, water sources, and fields. Estimates of those killed by Unit 731 and its related programs range up to half a million people, and none of the inmates survived.

Originally set up by the Kenpeitai military police of the Empire of Japan, Unit 731 was taken over and commanded until the end of the war by General Shirō Ishii, a combat medic officer in the Kwantung Army. The facility itself was built in 1935 as a replacement for the Zhongma Fortress, and Ishii and his team used it to expand their capabilities. The program received generous support from the Japanese government until the end of the war in 1945. Unit 731 and the other units of the Epidemic Prevention and Water Purification Department operated biological weapon production, testing, deployment, and storage facilities.

While Unit 731 researchers arrested by Soviet forces were tried at the December 1949 Khabarovsk war crime trials, those captured by the United States were secretly given immunity in exchange for the data gathered during their human experiments. The United States covered up the human experimentations and handed stipends to the perpetrators. The Americans co-opted the researchers' bioweapons information and experience for use in their own biological warfare program, much like what had been done with Nazi German researchers in Operation Paperclip. On 28 August 2002, Tokyo District Court ruled that Japan had committed biological warfare in China and consequently had slaughtered many residents.

Formation 

Japan started their biological weapons program in the 1930s, partly because biological weapons were banned by the Geneva Convention of 1925; they reasoned that the ban verified its effectiveness as a weapon. Japan's occupation of Manchuria began in 1931 after the Japanese invasion of Manchuria. Japan decided to build Unit 731 in Manchuria because the occupation not only gave the Japanese an advantage of separating the research station from their island, but also gave them access to as many Chinese individuals as they wanted for use as human experimental subjects. They viewed the Chinese as no cost research subjects, and hoped that they could use this advantage to lead the world in biological warfare. The majority of research subjects were Chinese, but many were of different nationalities.

In 1932, Surgeon General , chief medical officer of the Imperial Japanese Army and protégé of Army Minister Sadao Araki, was placed in command of the Army Epidemic Prevention Research Laboratory (AEPRL). Ishii organized a secret research group, the "Tōgō Unit", for chemical and biological experimentation in Manchuria. Ishii had proposed the creation of a Japanese biological and chemical research unit in 1930, after a two-year study trip abroad, on the grounds that Western powers were developing their own programs.

One of Ishii's main supporters inside the army was Colonel Chikahiko Koizumi, who later served as Japan's Health Minister from 1941 to 1945. Koizumi had joined a secret poison gas research committee in 1915, during World War I, when he and other Imperial Japanese Army officers were impressed by the successful German use of chlorine gas at the Second Battle of Ypres, in which the Allies suffered 5,000 deaths and 15,000 wounded as a result of the chemical attack.

Zhongma Fortress 
The prisoners brought to Zhongma included common criminals, captured bandits, anti-Japanese partisans, as well as political prisoners and people rounded up on trumped up charges by the Kempeitai. Prisoners were generally well fed on a diet of rice or wheat, meat, fish, and occasionally even alcohol in order to be in normal health at the beginning of experiments. Then, over several days, prisoners were eventually drained of blood and deprived of nutrients and water. Their deteriorating health was recorded. Some were also vivisected. Others were deliberately infected with plague bacteria and other microbes.

A prison break in the autumn of 1934, which jeopardized the facility's secrecy, and an explosion in 1935 (believed to be sabotage) led Ishii to shut down Zhongma Fortress.

Unit 731 

In 1936, Emperor Hirohito issued a decree authorizing the expansion of the unit and its integration into the Kwantung Army as the Epidemic Prevention Department. It was divided at that time into the "Ishii Unit" and "Wakamatsu Unit", with a base in Hsinking. From August 1940 on, the units were known collectively as the "Epidemic Prevention and Water Purification Department of the Kwantung Army" (関東軍防疫給水部本部) or "Unit 731" (満州第731部隊) for short.

His younger brother, Prince Mikasa, toured the Unit 731 headquarters in China, and wrote in his memoir that he watched films showing how Chinese prisoners were "made to march on the plains of Manchuria for poison gas experiments on humans."

Other units 

In addition to the establishment of Unit 731, the decree also called for the creation of an additional biological warfare development unit, called the Kwantung Army Military Horse Epidemic Prevention Workshop (later referred to as Manchuria Unit 100), and a chemical warfare development unit called the Kwantung Army Technical Testing Department (later referred to as Manchuria Unit 516). After the Japanese invasion of China in 1937, sister chemical and biological warfare units were founded in major Chinese cities and were referred to as Epidemic Prevention and Water Supply Units. Detachments included Unit 1855 in Beijing, Unit Ei 1644 in Nanjing, Unit 8604 in Guangzhou, and later Unit 9420 in Singapore. All of these units comprised Ishii's network, which, at its height in 1939, oversaw over 10,000 personnel. Medical doctors and professors from Japan were attracted to join Unit 731 both by the rare opportunity to conduct human experimentation and the Army's strong financial backing.

Experiments 
A special project, codenamed Maruta, used human beings for experiments. This term originated as a joke on the part of the staff because the official cover story for the facility given to local authorities was that it was a lumber mill. However, according to a junior uniformed civilian employee of the Imperial Japanese Army working in Unit 731, the project was internally called "Holzklotz", German for log. In a further parallel, the corpses of "sacrificed" subjects were disposed of by incineration. Researchers in Unit 731 also published some of their results in peer-reviewed journals, writing as though the research had been conducted on nonhuman primates called "Manchurian monkeys" or "long-tailed monkeys".

According to American historian Sheldon H. Harris:
The Togo Unit employed gruesome tactics to secure specimens of select body organs. If Ishii or one of his co-workers wished to do research on the human brain, then they would order the guards to find them a useful sample. A prisoner would be taken from his cell. Guards would hold him while another guard would smash the victim's head open with an ax. His brain would be extracted off to the pathologist, and then to the crematorium for the usual disposal.

, professor emeritus at Osaka University, studied at Kyoto University during the war. While he was there, he watched footage of human experiments and executions from Unit 731. He later testified about the playfulness of the experimenters:

Some of the experiments had nothing to do with advancing the capability of germ warfare, or of medicine. There is such a thing as professional curiosity: ‘What would happen if we did such and such?’ What medical purpose was served by performing and studying beheadings? None at all. That was just playing around. Professional people, too, like to play."

Prisoners were injected with diseases, disguised as vaccinations, to study their effects. To study the effects of untreated venereal diseases, male and female prisoners were deliberately infected with syphilis and gonorrhea, then studied. Prisoners were also repeatedly subjected to rape by guards.

Vivisection 
Thousands of men, women, children, and infants interned at prisoner of war camps were subjected to vivisection, often performed without anesthesia and usually lethal. In a video interview, former Unit 731 member Okawa Fukumatsu admitted to having vivisected a pregnant woman. Vivisections were performed on prisoners after infecting them with various diseases. Researchers performed invasive surgery on prisoners, removing organs to study the effects of disease on the human body.

Prisoners had limbs amputated in order to study blood loss. Limbs removed were sometimes reattached to the opposite side of victims' bodies. Some prisoners had their stomachs surgically removed and their esophagus reattached to the intestines. Parts of organs, such as the brain, lungs, and liver, were removed from others. Imperial Japanese Army surgeon Ken Yuasa suggests that practising vivisection on human subjects was widespread even outside Unit 731, estimating that at least 1,000 Japanese personnel were involved in the practice in mainland China. Yuasa said that when he performed vivisections on captives, they were "all for practice rather than for research", and that such practises were "routine" among Japanese doctors stationed in China during the war.

New York Times interviewed a former member of Unit 731. Insisting on anonymity, the former Japanese medical assistant recounted his first experience in dissecting a live human being, who had been deliberately infected with the plague, for the purpose of developing "plague bombs" for war. "The fellow knew that it was over for him, and so he didn't struggle when they led him into the room and tied him down, but when I picked up the scalpel, that's when he began screaming. I cut him open from the chest to the stomach, and he screamed terribly, and his face was all twisted in agony. He made this unimaginable sound, he was screaming so horribly. But then finally he stopped. This was all in a day's work for the surgeons, but it really left an impression on me because it was my first time."

Biological warfare 

Unit 731 and its affiliated units (Unit 1644 and Unit 100, among others) were involved in research, development and experimental deployment of epidemic-creating biowarfare weapons in assaults against the Chinese populace (both military and civilian) throughout World War II. Plague-infected fleas, bred in the laboratories of Unit 731 and Unit 1644, were spread by low-flying airplanes over Chinese cities, including coastal Ningbo and Changde, Hunan Province, in 1940 and 1941. These operations killed tens of thousands with bubonic plague epidemics. An expedition to Nanjing involved spreading typhoid and paratyphoid germs into the wells, marshes, and houses of the city, as well as infusing them in snacks distributed to locals. Epidemics broke out shortly after, to the elation of many researchers, who concluded that paratyphoid fever was "the most effective" of the pathogens.

At least 12 large-scale bioweapon field trials were carried out, and at least 11 Chinese cities attacked with biological agents. An attack on Changde in 1941 reportedly led to approximately 10,000 biological casualties and 1,700 deaths among ill-prepared Japanese troops, in most cases due to cholera. Japanese researchers performed tests on prisoners with bubonic plague, cholera, smallpox, botulism, and other diseases. This research led to the development of the defoliation bacilli bomb and the flea bomb used to spread bubonic plague. Some of these bombs were designed with porcelain shells, an idea proposed by Ishii in 1938.

These bombs enabled Japanese soldiers to launch biological attacks, infecting agriculture, reservoirs, wells, as well as other areas, with anthrax- and plague-carrier fleas, typhoid, cholera, or other deadly pathogens. During biological bomb experiments, researchers dressed in protective suits would examine the dying victims. Infected food supplies and clothing were dropped by airplane into areas of China not occupied by Japanese forces. In addition, poisoned food and candy were given to unsuspecting victims. Plague fleas, infected clothing, and infected supplies encased in bombs were dropped on various targets. The resulting cholera, anthrax, and plague were estimated to have killed at least 400,000 Chinese civilians. Tularemia was also tested on Chinese civilians.

Due to pressure from numerous accounts of the biowarfare attacks, Chiang Kai-shek sent a delegation of army and foreign medical personnel in November 1941 to document evidence and treat the afflicted. A report on the Japanese use of plague-infected fleas on Changde was made widely available the following year but was not addressed by the Allied Powers until Franklin D. Roosevelt issued a public warning in 1943 condemning the attacks.

During the final months of World War II, codenamed Cherry Blossoms at Night,
the plan of Unit 731 was to use kamikaze pilots to infest San Diego, California, with the plague. The plan was scheduled to launch on 22 September 1945, but Japan surrendered five weeks earlier.

Weapons testing 
Human targets were used to test grenades positioned at various distances and in various positions. Flamethrowers were tested on people. Victims were also tied to stakes and used as targets to test pathogen-releasing bombs, chemical weapons, shrapnel bombs with varying amounts of fragments, and explosive bombs as well as bayonets and knives.

Other experiments 
In other tests, subjects were deprived of food and water to determine the length of time until death; placed into low-pressure chambers until their eyes popped from the sockets; experimented upon to determine the relationship between temperature, burns, and human survival; hung upside down until death; crushed with heavy objects; electrocuted; dehydrated with hot fans; placed into centrifuges and spun until death; injected with animal blood, notably with horse blood; exposed to lethal doses of X-rays; subjected to various chemical weapons inside gas chambers; injected with seawater; and burned or buried alive. In addition to chemical agents, the properties of many different toxins were also investigated by the Unit. To name a few, prisoners were exposed to tetrodotoxin (pufferfish or fugu venom), heroin, Korean bindweed, bactal, and castor-oil seeds (ricin). Massive amounts of blood were drained from some prisoners in order to study the effects of blood loss according to former Unit 731 vivisectionist Okawa Fukumatsu. In one case, at least half a liter of blood was drawn at two-to-three-day intervals.

As stated above, dehydration experiments were performed on the victims. The purpose of these tests was to determine the amount of water in an individual's body and to see how long one could survive with a very low to no water intake. It is known that victims were also starved before these tests began. The deteriorating physical states of these victims were documented by staff at a periodic interval.

Unit 731 also performed transfusion experiments with different blood types. Unit member Naeo Ikeda wrote:

Unit 731 tested many different chemical agents on prisoners and had a building dedicated to gas experiments. Some of the agents tested were mustard gas, lewisite, cyanic acid gas, white phosphorus, adamsite, and phosgene gas. A former army major and technician gave the following testimony anonymously (at the time of the interview, this man was a professor emeritus at a national university):

Takeo Wano, a former medical worker in Unit 731, said that he saw a Western man, who was vertically cut into two pieces, pickled in a jar of formaldehyde. Wano guessed that the man was Russian because there were many Russians living in the area at that time.

Unit 100 also experimented with toxic gas. Phone booth-like tanks were used as portable gas chambers for the prisoners. Some were forced to wear various types of gas masks; others wore military uniforms, and some wore no clothes at all.

Some of the tests have been described as "psychopathically sadistic, with no conceivable military application". For example, one experiment documented the time it took for three-day-old babies to freeze to death.

Unit 731 also tested chemical weapons on prisoners in field conditions. A report authored by unknown researcher in the Kamo Unit (Unit 731) describes a large human experiment of yperite gas (mustard gas) on 7–10 September 1940. Twenty subjects were divided into three groups and placed in combat emplacements, trenches, gazebos, and observatories. One group was clothed with Chinese underwear, no hat, and no mask and was subjected to as much as 1,800 field gun rounds of yperite gas over 25 minutes. Another group was clothed in summer military uniform and shoes; three had masks and another three had no mask. They also were exposed to as much as 1,800 rounds of yperite gas. A third group was clothed in summer military uniform, three with masks and two without masks, and were exposed to as much as 4,800 rounds. Then their general symptoms and damage to skin, eye, respiratory organs, and digestive organs were observed at 4 hours, 24 hours, and 2, 3, and 5 days after the shots. Injecting the blister fluid from one subject into another subject and analyses of blood and soil were also performed. Five subjects were forced to drink a solution of yperite and lewisite gas in water, with or without decontamination. The report describes conditions of every subject precisely without mentioning what happened to them in the long run. The following is an excerpt of one of these reports:

Frostbite testing 
Army Engineer Hisato Yoshimura conducted experiments by taking captives outside, dipping various appendages into water of varying temperatures, and allowing the limb to freeze. Once frozen, Yoshimura would strike their affected limbs with a short stick, "emitting a sound resembling that which a board gives when it is struck". Ice was then chipped away, with the affected area being subjected to various treatments, such as being doused in water, exposed to the heat of fire, etc.

Members of the Unit referred to Yoshimura as a "scientific devil" and a "cold-blooded animal" because he would conduct his work with strictness. Naoji Uezono, a member of Unit 731, described in a 1980s interview a grisly scene where Yoshimura had "two naked men put in an area 40–50 degrees below zero and researchers filmed the whole process until [the subjects] died. [The subjects] suffered such agony they were digging their nails into each other's flesh". Yoshimura's lack of remorse was evident in an article he wrote for the Journal Of Japanese Physiology in 1950 in which he admitted to using 20 children and a three-day-old infant in experiments which exposed them to zero-degree-Celsius ice and salt water. Although this article drew criticism, Yoshimura denied any guilt when contacted by a reporter from the Mainichi Shimbun. Yoshimura developed a "resistance index of frostbite" based on the mean temperature 5 to 30 minutes after immersion in freezing water, the temperature of the first rise after immersion, and the time until the temperature first rises after immersion. In a number of separate experiments it was then determined how these parameters depend on the time of day a victim's body part was immersed in freezing water, the surrounding temperature and humidity during immersion, how the victim had been treated before the immersion ("after keeping awake for a night", "after hunger for 24 hours", "after hunger for 48 hours", "immediately after heavy meal", "immediately after hot meal", "immediately after muscular exercise", "immediately after cold bath", "immediately after hot bath"), what type of food the victim had been fed over the five days preceding the immersions with regard to dietary nutrient intake ("high protein (of animal nature)", "high protein (of vegetable nature)", "low protein intake", and "standard diet"), and salt intake (45 g NaCl per day, 15 g NaCl per day, no salt). This original data is seen in the attached figure.

Syphilis 
Unit members orchestrated forced sex acts between infected and noninfected prisoners to transmit the disease, as the testimony of a prison guard on the subject of devising a method for transmission of syphilis between patients shows:

After victims were infected, they were vivisected at different stages of infection, so that internal and external organs could be observed as the disease progressed. Testimony from multiple guards blames the female victims as being hosts of the diseases, even as they were forcibly infected. Genitals of female prisoners that were infected with syphilis were called "jam-filled buns" by guards.

Some children grew up inside the walls of Unit 731, infected with syphilis. A Youth Corps member deployed to train at Unit 731 recalled viewing a batch of subjects that would undergo syphilis testing: "one was a Chinese woman holding an infant, one was a White Russian woman with a daughter of four or five years of age, and the last was a White Russian woman with a boy of about six or seven." The children of these women were tested in ways similar to their parents, with specific emphasis on determining how longer infection periods affected the effectiveness of treatments.

Rape and forced pregnancy 
Female prisoners were forced to become pregnant for use in experiments. The hypothetical possibility of vertical transmission (from mother to child) of diseases, particularly syphilis, was the stated reason for the torture. Fetal survival and damage to mother's reproductive organs were objects of interest. Though "a large number of babies were born in captivity", there have been no accounts of any survivors of Unit 731, children included. It is suspected that the children of female prisoners were killed after birth or aborted.

While male prisoners were often used in single studies, so that the results of the experimentation on them would not be clouded by other variables, women were sometimes used in bacteriological or physiological experiments, sex experiments, and as the victims of sex crimes. The testimony of a unit member that served as a guard graphically demonstrated this reality:

Prisoners and victims 
In 2002, Changde, China, site of the plague flea bombing, held an "International Symposium on the Crimes of Bacteriological Warfare", which estimated that the number of people slaughtered by the Imperial Japanese Army germ warfare and other human experiments was around 580,000. The American historian Sheldon H. Harris states that over 200,000 died. In addition to Chinese casualties, 1,700 Japanese troops in Zhejiang during Zhejiang-Jiangxi campaign were killed by their own biological weapons while attempting to unleash the biological agent, indicating serious issues with distribution. Harris also said plague-infected animals were released near the end of the war, and caused plague outbreaks that killed at least 30,000 people in the Harbin area from 1946 to 1948.

Some test subjects were selected to gather a wide cross-section of the population and included common criminals, captured bandits, anti-Japanese partisans, political prisoners, homeless and mentally disabled people, which included infants, men, the elderly and pregnant women, as well as those rounded up by the Kenpeitai military police for alleged "suspicious activities". Unit 731 staff included approximately 300 researchers, including doctors and bacteriologists.

At least 3,000 men, women, and children—from which at least 600 every year were provided by the Kenpeitai—were subjected to Unit 731 experimentation conducted at the Pingfang camp alone, not including victims from other medical experimentation sites such as Unit 100. Although 3,000 internal victims is the widely accepted figure in the literature, former Unit member Okawa Fukumatsu refuted it in a video interview. He stated that there were at least over 10,000 victims of internal experiments at the Unit and that he himself vivisected thousands.

According to A. S. Wells, the majority of victims were Chinese, with a lesser percentage being Russian, Mongolian, and Korean. They may also have included a small number of European, American, Indian, Australian, and New Zealander prisoners of war. A member of the Yokusan Sonendan paramilitary political youth branch, who worked for Unit 731, stated that not only were Chinese, Russians, and Koreans present, but also Americans, British, and French people. Sheldon H. Harris documented that the victims were generally political dissidents, communist sympathizers, ordinary criminals, impoverished civilians, and the mentally disabled. Author Seiichi Morimura estimates that almost 70 percent of the victims who died in the Pingfang camp were Chinese (both military and civilian), while close to 30 percent of the victims were Russian.

No one who entered Unit 731 came out alive. Prisoners were usually received into Unit 731 at night in motor vehicles painted black with a ventilation hole but no windows. The vehicle would pull up at the main gates and one of the drivers would go to the guardroom and report to the guard. That guard would then telephone to the "Special Team" in the inner-prison (Shiro Ishii's brother was head of this Special Team). Then, the prisoners would be transported through a secret tunnel dug under the facade of the central building to the inner-prisons. One of the prisons housed women and children (Building 8), while the other prison housed men (Building 7). Once at the inner-prison, technicians would take samples of the prisoners' blood and stool, test their kidney function, and collect other physical data. Once deemed healthy and fit for experimentation, prisoners lost their names and were given a three-digit number, which they retained until their death. Whenever prisoners died after the experiments they had been subjected to, a clerk of the 1st Division struck their numbers off an index card and took the deceased prisoner's manacles to be put on new arrivals to the prison.

There is at least one recorded instance of "friendly" social interaction between prisoners and Unit 731 staff. Technician Naokata Ishibashi interacted with two female prisoners. One prisoner was a 21-year-old Chinese woman, the other a Soviet girl who was 19 years of age. Ishibashi asked where she came from and learned that she was from Ukraine. The two prisoners told Ishibashi that they had not seen their faces in a mirror since being captured and begged him to get one. Ishibashi sneaked a mirror to them through a hole in the cell door. Prisoners were repeatedly reused for experiments as long as they were healthy enough. The average life expectancy of a prisoner once they had entered the Unit was two months. Some prisoners were alive in the Unit for over 12 months, and many female prisoners gave birth in the Unit.

The prison cells had wooden floors and a squat toilet in each. There was space between the outer walls of the cells and the outer walls of the prison, enabling the guards to walk behind the cells. Each cell door had a small window in it. Chief of the Personnel Division of the Kwantung Army Headquarters Tamura Tadashi testified that, when he was shown the inner-prison, he looked into the cells and saw living people in chains, some moved around, others were lying on the bare floor and were in a very sick and helpless condition. Former Unit 731 Youth Corps member Yoshio Shinozuka testified that the windows in these prison doors were so small that it was difficult to see in. The inner-prison was a highly secured building complete with cast iron doors. No one could enter without special permits and an ID pass with a photograph, and the entry/exit times were recorded. The "special team" worked in these two inner-prison buildings. This team wore white overall suits, army hats, rubber boots, and pistols strapped to their sides.

A former member of the Special Team (who insisted on anonymity) recalled in 1995 his first vivisection conducted at the Unit:

Other sources suggest that it was the usual practice in the Unit for surgeons to stuff a rag (or medical gauze) into the mouth of prisoners before commencing vivisection in order to stifle any screaming.

Despite the prison's status as a highly secure building, at least one unsuccessful escape attempt did occur. Corporal Kikuchi Norimitsu testified that he was told by another unit member that a prisoner "had shown violence and had struck the experimenter with a door handle" and then "jumped out of the cell and ran down the corridor, seized the keys and opened the iron doors and some of the cells. Some of the prisoners managed to jump out but these were only the bold ones. These bold ones were shot". Seiichi Morimura in his book The Devil's Feast went into some greater detail regarding this escape attempt. Two Russian male prisoners were in a cell with handcuffs on, one of them lay flat on the floor pretending to be sick. This got the attention of a staff member who saw it as an unusual condition. That staff member decided to enter the cell. The Russian lying on the floor suddenly sprang up and knocked the guard down. The two Russians opened their handcuffs, took the keys, and opened some other cells while yelling. Some prisoners, including Russian and Chinese, were frantically roaming the corridors and kept yelling and shouting. One Russian shouted to the members of Unit 731, demanding to be shot rather than used as an experimental object. This Russian was shot to death. One staff member, who was an eyewitness at this escape attempt, recalled: "spiritually we were all lost in front of the 'marutas' who had no freedom and no weapons. At that time we understood in our hearts that justice was not on our side". Unfortunately for the prisoners of Unit 731, escape was an impossibility. Even if they had managed to escape the quadrangle (itself a heavily fortified building full of staff), they would have had to get over a  brick wall surrounding the complex, and then across a dry moat filled with electrified wire running around the perimeter of the complex (which can be seen in aerial pictures of the Unit).

Members of Unit 731 were not immune from being subjects of experiments. Yoshio Tamura, an assistant in the Special Team, recalled that Yoshio Sudō, an employee of the first division at Unit 731, became infected with bubonic plague as a result of the production of plague bacteria. The Special Team was then ordered to vivisect Sudō. Tamura recalled:

Additionally, Unit 731 Youth Corps member Yoshio Shinozuka testified that his friend junior assistant Mitsuo Hirakawa was vivisected as a result of being accidentally infected with plague.

Known unit members 
There are unit members who were known to be interned at the Fushun War Criminals Management Centre and Taiyuan War Criminals Management Centre after the war, who then went on to be repatriated to Japan and founded the Association of Returnees from China and testified about Unit 731 and the crimes perpetrated there.

Some members included:
 Yoshio Shinozuka
 Yasuji Kaneko
 
 Shigeru Fujita
 Ken Yuasa

In April 2018, the National Archives of Japan disclosed a nearly complete list of 3,607 members of Unit 731 to Katsuo Nishiyama, a professor at Shiga University of Medical Science. Nishiyama reportedly intended to publish the list online to encourage further study into the unit.

Previously disclosed members included:

 Lieutenant General Shirō Ishii
 Lieutenant Colonel , founder of the pharmaceutical company Green Cross
 Professor, Major General Masaji Kitano, commander, 1942–1945
 Yoshio Shinozuka
 Yasuji Kaneko
 Kazuhisa Kanazawa, chief of the 1st Division of Branch 673 of Unit 731
 Ryoichiro Hotta, member of the Hailar Branch of Unit 731
 Shigeo Ozeki, civilian employee
 Kioyashi Mineoi, civilian employee
 Masateru Saito, civilian employee
 Major General Hitoshi Kikuchi, head of Research Division, 1942–1945
 Lieutenant General [unknown first name] Yasazaka, doctor
 Yoshio Furuichi, student at Sunyu Branch of Unit 731

There were also twelve members who were formally tried and sentenced in the Khabarovsk War Crime Trials.

Other suspected Japanese war criminals who were never indicted include three postwar prime ministers: Hatoyama Ichirō (1954–1956), Kishi Nobusuke (1957–1960), and Ikeda Hayato (1960–1964).

Divisions 
Unit 731 was divided into eight divisions:
 Division 1: research on bubonic plague, cholera, anthrax, typhoid, and tuberculosis using live human subjects; for this purpose, a prison was constructed to contain around three to four hundred people
 Division 2: research for biological weapons used in the field, in particular the production of devices to spread germs and parasites
 Division 3: production of shells containing biological agents; stationed in Harbin
 Division 4: bacteria mass-production and storage
 Division 5: training of personnel
 Divisions 6–8: equipment, medical, and administrative units

Facilities 

Unit 731 had other units underneath it in the chain of command; there were several other units under the auspice of Japan's biological weapons programs. Most or all Units had branch offices, which were also often referred to as "Units". The term Unit 731 can refer to the Harbin complex itself, or it can refer to the organization and its branches, sub-Units and their branches.

The Unit 731 complex covered  and consisted of more than 150 buildings. The design of the facilities made them hard to destroy by bombing. The complex contained various factories. It had around 4,500 containers to be used to raise fleas, six cauldrons to produce various chemicals, and around 1,800 containers to produce biological agents. Approximately  of bubonic plague bacteria could be produced in a few days.

Some of Unit 731's satellite (branch) facilities are still in use by various Chinese industrial companies. A portion has been preserved and is open to visitors as a War Crimes Museum.

Branches 
Unit 731 had branches in Linkou (Branch 162), Mudanjiang, Hailin (Branch 643), Sunwu (Branch 673), Toan, and Hailar (Branch 543).

Tokyo 
A medical school and research facility belonging to Unit 731 operated in the Shinjuku District of Tokyo during World War II. In 2006, Toyo Ishii—a nurse who worked at the school during the war—revealed that she had helped bury bodies and pieces of bodies on the school's grounds shortly after Japan's surrender in 1945. In response, in February 2011 the Ministry of Health began to excavate the site.

While Tokyo courts acknowledged in 2002 that Unit 731 has been involved in biological warfare research,  the Japanese government had made no official acknowledgment of the atrocities committed against test subjects and rejected the Chinese government's requests for DNA samples to identify human remains (including skulls and bones) found near an army medical school.

At Tokyo's Kyushu Imperial University in 1945, US POWs from a shot down B-29 were subjected to fatal medical experimentation.

Surrender and immunity 
Operations and experiments continued until the end of the war. Ishii had wanted to use biological weapons in the Pacific War since May 1944, but his attempts were repeatedly snubbed.

Destruction of evidence 

With the coming of the Red Army in August 1945, the unit had to abandon their work in haste. Ministries in Tokyo ordered the destruction of all incriminating materials, including those in Pingfang. Potential witnesses, such as the 300 remaining prisoners, were either gassed or fed poison while the 600 Chinese and Manchurian laborers were shot. Ishii ordered every member of the group to disappear and "take the secret to the grave". Potassium cyanide vials were issued for use in case the remaining personnel were captured.

Skeleton crews of Ishii's Japanese troops blew up the compound in the final days of the war to destroy evidence of their activities, but many were sturdy enough to remain somewhat intact.

American grant of immunity 

Among the individuals in Japan after its 1945 surrender was Lieutenant Colonel Murray Sanders, who arrived in Yokohama via the American ship Sturgess in September 1945. Sanders was a highly regarded microbiologist and a member of America's military center for biological weapons. Sanders' duty was to investigate Japanese biological warfare activity. At the time of his arrival in Japan, he had no knowledge of what Unit 731 was. Until Sanders finally threatened the Japanese with bringing the Soviets into the picture, little information about biological warfare was being shared with the Americans. The Japanese wanted to avoid prosecution under the Soviet legal system, so, the  morning after he made his threat, Sanders received a manuscript describing Japan's involvement in biological warfare. Sanders took this information to General Douglas MacArthur, who was the Supreme Commander of the Allied Powers and responsible for rebuilding Japan during the Allied occupations. MacArthur struck a deal with Japanese informants: he secretly granted immunity to the physicians of Unit 731, including their leader, in exchange for providing America, but not the other wartime allies, with their research on biological warfare and data from human experimentation. American occupation authorities monitored the activities of former unit members, including reading and censoring their mail. The Americans believed that the research data was valuable and did not want other nations, particularly the Soviet Union, to acquire data on biological weapons.

The Tokyo War Crimes Tribunal heard only one reference to Japanese experiments with "poisonous serums" on Chinese civilians. This took place in August 1946 and was instigated by David Sutton, assistant to the Chinese prosecutor. The Japanese defense counsel argued that the claim was vague and uncorroborated and it was dismissed by the tribunal president, Sir William Webb, for lack of evidence. The subject was not pursued further by Sutton, who was probably unaware of Unit 731's activities. His reference to it at the trial is believed to have been accidental. Later in 1981, one of the last surviving members of the Tokyo Tribunal, Judge Röling, had expressed bitterness in not being made aware of the suppression of evidence of Unit 731 and wrote, "It is a bitter experience for me to be informed now that centrally ordered Japanese war criminality of the most disgusting kind was kept secret from the court by the U.S. government."

While German physicians were brought to trial and had their crimes publicized, the U.S. concealed information about Japanese biological warfare experiments and secured immunity for the perpetrators. Critics argue that racism led to the double standard in the American postwar responses to the experiments conducted on different nationalities. Whereas the perpetrators of Unit 731 were exempt from prosecution, the U.S. held a tribunal in Yokohama in 1948 that indicted nine Japanese physician professors and medical students for conducting vivisection upon captured American pilots; two professors were sentenced to death and others to 15–20 years' imprisonment.

Separate Soviet trials 
Although publicly silent on the issue at the Tokyo Trials, the Soviet Union pursued the case and prosecuted 12 top military leaders and scientists from Unit 731 and its affiliated biological-war prisons Unit 1644 in Nanjing and Unit 100 in Changchun in the Khabarovsk war crimes trials. Among those accused of war crimes, including germ warfare, was General Otozō Yamada, commander-in-chief of the million-man Kwantung Army occupying Manchuria.

The trial of the Japanese perpetrators was held in Khabarovsk in December 1949; a lengthy partial transcript of trial proceedings was published in different languages the following year by the Moscow foreign languages press, including an English-language edition. The lead prosecuting attorney at the Khabarovsk trial was Lev Smirnov, who had been one of the top Soviet prosecutors at the Nuremberg Trials. The Japanese doctors and army commanders who had perpetrated the Unit 731 experiments received sentences from the Khabarovsk court ranging from 2 to 25 years in a Siberian labor camp. The United States refused to acknowledge the trials, branding them communist propaganda. The sentences doled out to the Japanese perpetrators were unusually lenient by Soviet standards, and all but two of the defendants returned to Japan by the 1950s (with one prisoner dying in prison and the other committing suicide inside his cell).

In addition to the accusations of propaganda, the US also asserted that the trials were to only serve as a distraction from the Soviet treatment of several hundred thousand Japanese prisoners of war; meanwhile, the USSR asserted that the US had given the Japanese diplomatic leniency in exchange for information regarding their human experimentation. The accusations of both the US and the USSR were true, and it is believed that the Japanese had also given information to the Soviets regarding their biological experimentation for judicial leniency. This was evidenced by the Soviet Union building a biological weapons facility in Sverdlovsk using documentation captured from Unit 731 in Manchuria.

Official silence during the American occupation of Japan 
As above, during the United States occupation of Japan, the members of Unit 731 and the members of other experimental units were allowed to go free. On 6 May 1947, Douglas MacArthur, the Supreme Commander of the Allied Forces, wrote to Washington in order to inform it that "additional data, possibly some statements from Ishii, can probably be obtained by informing Japanese involved that information will be retained in intelligence channels and will not be employed as 'war crimes' evidence".

One graduate of Unit 1644, Masami Kitaoka, continued to perform experiments on unwilling Japanese subjects from 1947 to 1956. He performed his experiments while he was working for Japan's National Institute of Health Sciences. He infected prisoners with rickettsia and infected mentally-ill patients with typhus. As the chief of the unit, Shiro Ishii was granted immunity from prosecution for war crimes by the American occupation authorities, because he had provided human experimentation research materials to them. From 1948 to 1958, less than five percent of the documents were transferred onto microfilm and stored in the US National Archives before they were shipped back to Japan.

Post-occupation Japanese media coverage and debate 
Japanese discussions of Unit 731's activity began in the 1950s, after the end of the American occupation of Japan. In 1952, human experiments carried out in Nagoya City Pediatric Hospital, which resulted in one death, were publicly tied to former members of Unit 731. Later in that decade, journalists suspected that the murders attributed by the government to Sadamichi Hirasawa were actually carried out by members of Unit 731. In 1958, Japanese author Shūsaku Endō published the book The Sea and Poison about human experimentation in Fukuoka, which is thought to have been based on a real incident.

The author Seiichi Morimura published  (悪魔の飽食) in 1981, followed by The Devil's Gluttony: A Sequel in 1983. These books purported to reveal the "true" operations of Unit 731, but falsely attributed unrelated photos to the Unit, which raised questions about their accuracy.

Also in 1981, the first direct testimony of human vivisection in China was given by Ken Yuasa. Since then, much more in depth testimony has been given in Japan. The 2001 documentary Japanese Devils largely consists of interviews with fourteen Unit 731 staff members taken prisoner by China and later released.

Significance in postwar research on bio-warfare and medicine 
Japanese Biological Warfare operations were by far the largest during WWII, and "possibly with more people and resources than the BW producing nations of France, Hungary, Italy, Poland, and the Soviet Union combined, between the world wars.
Although the dissemination methods of delivering plague infected fleas by aircraft were crude, the method, among others, allowed the Japanese to "conduct the most extensive employment of biological weapons during WWII." However, the amount of effort devoted to BW was not matched by its results. Ultimately, inadequate scientific and engineering foundations limited the effectiveness of the Japanese program. Harris speculates that US scientists generally wanted to acquire it due to the concept of forbidden fruit, believing that lawful and ethical prohibitions could affect the outcomes of their research.

Official government response in Japan 

In 2018, Japan disclosed the names of 3,607 members of Unit 731. The information was from the country's national archives. The Japanese government hesitantly acknowledged the unit's existence in the late 1990s, but has refused to discuss its activities.

In 1983, the Japanese Ministry of Education asked Japanese historian Saburō Ienaga to remove a reference from one of his textbooks that stated Unit 731 conducted experiments on thousands of Chinese. The Ministry alleged that no academic research supported the claim. In 1984, Japanese historian Tsuneishi Keiichi translated and published over 4,000 pages of U.S. documents on Japanese biological warfare. The Ministry backed down after new studies were published in Japan and important evidence surfaced in the United States.

Japanese history textbooks usually contain references to Unit 731, but do not go into detail about allegations, in accordance with this principle. Saburō Ienaga's New History of Japan included a detailed description, based on officers' testimony. The Ministry for Education attempted to remove this passage from his textbook before it was taught in public schools, on the basis that the testimony was insufficient. The Supreme Court of Japan ruled in 1997 that the testimony was indeed sufficient and that requiring it to be removed was an illegal violation of freedom of speech.

In 1997, international lawyer Kōnen Tsuchiya filed a class action suit against the Japanese government, demanding reparations for the actions of Unit 731, using evidence filed by Professor Makoto Ueda of Rikkyo University. All levels of the Japanese court system found the suit baseless. No findings of fact were made about the existence of human experimentation, but the courts' ruling was that reparations are determined by international treaties, not national courts.

In August 2002, the Tokyo district court ruled for the first time that Japan had engaged in biological warfare. Presiding judge Koji Iwata ruled that Unit 731, on the orders of the Imperial Japanese Army headquarters, used bacteriological weapons on Chinese civilians between 1940 and 1942, spreading diseases, including plague and typhoid, in the cities of Quzhou, Ningbo, and Changde. However, he rejected victims' compensation claims on the grounds that they had already been settled by international peace treaties.

In October 2003, a member of Japan's House of Representatives filed an inquiry. Prime Minister Junichiro Koizumi responded that the Japanese government did not then possess any records related to Unit 731, but recognized the gravity of the matter and would publicize any records located in the future. In April 2018, the National Archives of Japan released the names of 3,607 members of Unit 731, in response to a request by Professor Katsuo Nishiyama of the Shiga University of Medical Science.

Abroad 
After World War II, the Office of Special Investigations created a watchlist of suspected Axis collaborators and persecutors who are banned from entering the United States. While they have added over 60,000 names to the watchlist, they have only been able to identify under 100 Japanese participants. In a 1998 correspondence letter between the DOJ and Rabbi Abraham Cooper, Eli Rosenbaum, director of OSI, stated that this was due to two factors:

 While most documents captured by the US in Europe were microfilmed before being returned to their respective governments, the Department of Defense decided to not microfilm its vast collection of documents before returning them to the Japanese government.
 The Japanese government has also failed to grant the OSI meaningful access to these and related records after the war, while European countries, on the other hand, have been largely cooperative, the cumulative effect of which is that information pertaining to identifying these individuals is, in effect, impossible to recover.

In popular culture

Print media 
 The Narrow Road to the Deep North, a Booker Prize-winning 2014 novel by Australian writer Richard Flanagan, refers extensively to the atrocities committed by a doctor who served in Unit 731.
  (1960), a novel by a Polish writer and educator Igor Newerly, was the first book published outside Asia which refers to atrocities committed in the unit.
 The Man Who Ended History: A Documentary (2011), a novella published in The Paper Menagerie book by American writer and Chinese translator Ken Liu: A scientific discovery allows a victim's descendant to go back in time to witness and learn the truth about the atrocities committed in the unit.
 Tricky Twenty-Two, a novel in the Stephanie Plum series by Janet Evanovich, features as its antagonist a deranged biology professor who is obsessed with Unit 731 and is attempting to recreate the unit's bubonic plague dispersals.
 The Solomon Curse, a novel in the Fargo Adventures series by Clive Cussler and Russell Blake, involves this unit in its plot, around secret human experimentation on the island of Guadalcanal.
 The Grimnoire Series, an alternative-history series of novels by Larry Correia, has Unit 731 conducting brutal magical experiments on prisoners of the Japanese Imperium.
 Setting Sun story from Hellblazer #142 by DC Comics, written by Warren Ellis and illustrated by Javier Pulido, features a fictitious character who used to be a doctor in Unit 731 during the war and conducted experiments on humans.
 In the manga My Hero Academia, a mad scientist who conducts experiments on humans to create a genetically modified race was first introduced as Shiga Maruta. Because of the association with the Maruta project, it caused a major controversy, especially in China, where Tencent and Bilibili removed the manga from their platforms. Both Weekly Shonen Jump magazine and the author Kōhei Horikoshi issued individual apologizing statements on Twitter, and the character name was changed in subsequent publications.
 Crisis in the Ashes, by William W. Johnstone features the grandson of Dr. Ishi who has samples of the bubonic plague that he is trying to use to stop the liberal dictator of the US from using to conduct ethnic cleansing.
 Occupied City (2010), a novel by British author David Peace who lives in Japan, presents a mystery about a murder on 26 January 1948 in Tokyo. A murderer poisons bank employees by pretending to be a government official administering a dysentery vaccine. Gradually, through the testimonies of various people connected to the tragedy, it becomes clear that the poisoner has a shared history with Unit 731.
 The Collector - Unit 731, a four-issue miniseries by Dark Horse Comics, written by Rod Monteiro and co-written and illustrated by Will Conrad, features a fictitious character who is captured by the Kenpeitai in Tokyo and taken to the Unit 731 as a prisoner of war.
 The English Führer (2023) by Rory Clements involves the use of Biological Weapons developed by Unit 731.

Films 
There have been several films about the atrocities of Unit 731.
  (1981); Coproduction of USSR, Mongolia, Eastern Germany. Miniseries (two episodes).
 The Sea and Poison (1986), Japan, directed by Kei Kumai
 Men Behind the Sun (1988), China, directed by Tun Fei Mou
  (1992), China, directed by Godfrey Ho
 Kizu (les fantômes de l'unité 731) (2004), France, directed by Serge Viallet
 731: Two Versions of Hell (2007), produced by James T. Hong; documentary about Unit 731 told from the Chinese and Japanese sides
 Philosophy of a Knife (2008), Russia, directed by 
 Dead Mine (2012), Indonesia, directed by Steven Sheil and based in a fictionalized version of Unit 731
 Dongju: The Portrait of a Poet (2016), South Korea, directed by Lee Junik, depicts dead poet Yoon Dong-ju
 Wife of a Spy (2020), Japan, directed by Kiyoshi Kurosawa and won the Silver Lion for Best Direction at the Venice Film Festival in 2020.

Music 
 "The Breeding House" (1994), Bruce Dickinson. Segment of the CD-single Tears of the Dragon, describing the atrocities committed by Unit 731 and the immunity granted by the Americans to the physicians of the Unit
 "Unit 731" (2009), American thrash metal band Slayer. Song on the album World Painted Blood, describing the events and atrocities that occurred at Unit 731
 "Unit 731" (2011), Power electronic band Brandkommando
 "And You Will Beg for Our Secrets" (2016), from the Anaal Nathrakh album The Whole of the Law, refers to Unit 731's activities and the US amnesty given in exchange for information resulting from the experiments carried out.
 "The New Eternity" (2018), from the Silent Planet album When the End Began refers to Unit 731's human experimentation and other crimes against humanity.
 "Maruta" (2009), South Korean metal band .

Television 
 Unit 731 – Did the Emperor Know? Television South documentary made in 1985 and first broadcast on the 13 August.
 The X-Files episode "731" (1995). Former members of Unit 731 secretly continue their experiments on humans under control of a covert US government agency.
 ReGenesis episode "Let it burn" (2007). Outbreaks of anthrax and glanders are traced to World War II Japan.
 Warehouse 13 episode "The 40th Floor" (2011). General Shirō Ishii's medal from Unit 731 simulated drowning when applied to a victim's skin.
 Concrete Revolutio. The experimentation on superhumans by the Japanese and Americans is a parallel to Unit 731.
 731 (2015). A five-episode CCTV documentary broadcast in 2015.
 The Truth of Unit 731: Elite medical students and human experiments (2017). An NHK Documentary broadcast in 2017, including paper materials, recording tapes, and interviews to former members and doctors who have implemented experiments in Unit 731.
 In The Blacklist, the episode "General Shiro" is a reference to Shirō Ishii.
 Kamen Rider Black Sun A 10 episode (2022) Amazon Prime Video reboot of the original Kamen Rider Black in Japan. The Kaijin experiments is similar to Unit 731. Dounami Michinosuke began the experiments in 1936. The title "業部総務司長(Chief General Affairs Officer)" is written on the document. It was also in 1936 that Nobusuke Kishi got the title of "業部総務司長(Chief General Affairs Officer)" in Manchuria, China.

Video games 
 In Call of Duty: Black Ops III, the Zombies map included in the second DLC pack, "Zetsubou no Shima", is loosely inspired by Unit 731.
 In the indie horror game Spooky's Jumpscare Mansion, the Unit 731 experiments are explicitly referenced multiple times in terms of Specimen 9 (specifically stated to be a survivor of the Unit 731 experiments), as well as the labeling of human bodies as "logs": "I'm taking all those 'logs' they keep throwing out, and I'm nailing them together".

See also 

 Allied war crimes during World War II
 American cover-up of Japanese war crimes
 British war crimes
 Comfort women
 German war crimes
 History of biological warfare
 History of chemical warfare
 Human subject research
 Italian war crimes
 Japanese war crimes
 List of Axis personnel indicted for war crimes
 Nobusuke Kishi
 Ōkunoshima
 Operation Bloodstone
 Operation Paperclip
 Project MKNAOMI
 Ratlines (World War II)
 Soviet war crimes
 Unethical human experimentation
 Unit 100
 Unit 1644
 Unit 1855
 Unit 516
 Unit 543
 Unit 8604
 Unit 9420
 United States war crimes
 War crime
 War crimes in Manchukuo
 War crimes of the Wehrmacht

Second Sino-Japanese War and World War II (Pacific Theater) 
 Changde chemical weapon attack
 Kaimingjie germ weapon attack
 Second Sino-Japanese War
 Pacific War

Other human experimentation 

 Ghouta chemical attack
 Halabja massacre
 Human experimentation in North Korea
 Josef Mengele
 Nazi human experimentation
 Poison laboratory of the Soviet secret services
 Project Coast
 Unethical human experimentation in the United States

Explanatory notes

References

Further reading 
 Barenblatt, Daniel. A Plague Upon Humanity: The Secret Genocide of Axis Japan's Germ Warfare Operation, HarperCollins, 2004. .
 Barnaby, Wendy. The Plague Makers: The Secret World of Biological Warfare, Frog Ltd, 1999.
 Cook, Haruko Taya; Cook, Theodore F. Japan at war: an oral history, New York: New Press: Distributed by Norton, 1992. . Cf. Part 2, Chapter 6 on Unit 731 and Tamura Yoshio.
 Endicott, Stephen and Hagerman, Edward. The United States and Biological Warfare: Secrets from the Early Cold War and Korea, Indiana University Press, 1999. .
 Felton, Mark. The devil's doctors: Japanese Human Experiments on Allied Prisoners of War, Pen & Sword, 2012. 
 Gold, Hal. Unit 731 Testimony, Charles E Tuttle Co., 1996. .
 Grunden, Walter E., Secret Weapons & World War II: Japan in the Shadow of Big Science, University Press of Kansas, 2005. .
 Handelman, Stephen and Alibek, Ken. Biohazard: The Chilling True Story of the Largest Covert Biological Weapons Program in the WorldTold from Inside by the Man Who Ran It, Random House, 1999. , .
 Harris, Robert and Paxman, Jeremy. A Higher Form of Killing: The Secret History of Chemical and Biological Warfare, Random House, 2002. .
 Harris, Sheldon H. Factories of Death: Japanese Biological Warfare 1932–45 and the American Cover-Up, Routledge, 1994. , .
 Lupis, Marco. "Orrori e misteri dell'Unità 731: la 'fabbrica' dei batteri killer", La Repubblica, 14 aprile 2003,
 Mangold, Tom; Goldberg, Jeff, Plague wars: a true story of biological warfare, Macmillan, 2000. Cf. Chapter 3, Unit 731.
 Moreno, Jonathan D. Undue Risk: Secret State Experiments on Humans, Routledge, 2001. .
 Nie, Jing Bao, et al. Japan's Wartime Medical Atrocities: Comparative Inquiries in Science, History, and Ethics (2011) excerpt and text search
 Tsuneishi, Keiichi (November 24, 2005). "Unit 731 and the Japanese Imperial Army's Biological Warfare Program". The Asia-Pacific Journal. Volume 3, Issue 11. Article ID 2194.
 Williams, Peter and Wallace, David. Unit 731: Japan's Secret Biological Warfare in World War II, The Free Press, A Division of Macmillan, Inc., New York. 1989. .
 Yang, Yan-Jun and Tam, Yue-Him. Unit 731: Laboratory of the Devil, Auschwitz of the East, Fonthill Media., UK. 2018. .

External links 

 The Nazi War Crimes and Japanese Imperial Government Records Interagency Working Group (IWG) – The U.S. National Archives and Records Administration (NARA).
 History of the Unit 731 Unit 731 information site.
 History of Japan's biological weapons program – The Federation of American Scientists (FAS).
 History of United States' biological weapons program – The Federation of American Scientists (FAS).
 Unit 731, Nightmare in Manchuria, a World Justice documentary.
  – AII POW-MIA images.
 Army Doctor – a firsthand account by Yuasa Ken.
 Theodicy – Through the Case of "Unit 731" by Eun Park (2003).
 "US paid for Japanese human germ warfare data", Australian Broadcasting Corporation News Online.
 Japan's sins of the past by Justin McCurry (2004), The Guardian.
 "The Asian Auschwitz of Unit 731" by Shane Green (2002), The Age.
 "War Crimes: Never Forget" – review of the book Unit 731 by Peter Williams and David Wallace
 , a documentary by NHK (2017)
 The Unknown Victims of Japanese Unit 731 in WWII (1932–1945) and Known Experiments
 Select Documents on Japanese WarCrimes and Japanese Biological Warfare, 1934–2006
 Unit 731 in Polish literature
 731 (2015), a documentary by CCTV

Biological warfare facilities
Imperial Japanese Army
Japanese human subject research
Military history of Japan during World War II
Second Sino-Japanese War
Second Sino-Japanese War crimes
1935 establishments in China
1945 disestablishments in China
Medical experimentation on prisoners
Crimes against humanity
War crimes in Manchukuo
Major National Historical and Cultural Sites in Heilongjiang
Japanese biological weapons program
Japanese war crimes